Archidamus may refer to:
one of several kings of Sparta:
Archidamus I (c. 600–575 BC)
Archidamus II (469–427 BC)
Archidamus III (360–338 BC)
Archidamus IV (305–275 BC)
Archidamus V (228–227 BC)
Archidamus (speech), a speech of Isocrates written in the voice of Archidamus III
Archidamus (physician), an ancient Greek doctor quoted by Galen who lived in the 4th or 5th century BCE
Archedemus (disambiguation), a name commonly interchanged with Archidamus in the ancient world